Shiny object syndrome is the situation where people focus undue attention on an idea that is new and trendy, yet drop this as soon as something new takes its place.

Usage 
Shiny object syndrome (SOS) is a pop-cultural, psychological concept where people focus on a new and fashionable idea, regardless of how valuable or helpful it may ultimately be. While at the moment it seems to be something worth focusing one's attention upon, it is ultimately a distraction, either a personal distraction or something that is done intentionally to distract others. People who face a fear of missing out are especially susceptible, as the distraction of shiny objects in themselves clouds judgment and focus.

The term shiny object syndrome is often used when people mistake something small and focused and fixate on it to the extent that they lose the big picture. This is used within management literature, popular psychological literature, and across the social and computer sciences.

See also
Appeal to novelty

References 

Popular psychology